Jerzy Bartmiński (19 September 1939 – 7 February 2022) was a Polish linguist and ethnologist.

Biography
Bartmiński was born in Przemyśl to a Polish family of Galician craftsmen, moved to Lublin in 1956, where he lived until his death in 2022.

He studied Polish philology, and in 1971, he earned his PhD, focusing his research on the language of folklore. As a young scholar at UMCS Lublin University together with his wife and children he established one of the first groups of home church Catholic Renewal movement in Poland. In the 1980s, he took part in anti-communist activities as a member of Solidarity and was a University leader of this movement in Lublin. He was repressed after declaration of the Martial law in Poland in 1981. Later, Bartmiński was one of the founders of "Solidarity of Families" movement and foundation, focusing on reactivation of social bonds in post-communist society, support for poor families, and educational support for children.

Bartmiński died in Lublin on 7 February 2022, at the age of 82.

Career
Bartmiński was member of the Polish Academy of Arts and Sciences, and professor of Polish philology at the Maria Curie-Skłodowska University in Lublin, Poland. From 1976 he led the research team that has been reorganized as the Department of Textology And Grammar of Contemporary Polish Language. For several years Bartmiński had been the chairman of jury of folklore songs festival in Kazimierz Dolny, one of the biggest events of this kind in Central Europe. Bartmiński was a member of the Polish Language Council.

He authored over 300 publications and books. One of his last books (2007), Linguistic Bases of the Perception of the World (Jezykowe podstawy obrazu swiata), is considered to be among the most significant Polish publications in the disciplines of the humanities.

His research interests focused on textology, linguistic axiology, and ethnolinguistics.

Footnotes

External links
Author's Official University Site
Equinox Books Author/Editor Details

1939 births
2022 deaths
Linguists from Poland
Polish ethnologists
Ethnolinguists
Polish folklorists
People from Przemyśl
Members of the Polish Academy of Learning
Maria Curie-Skłodowska University alumni
Recipients of the Gold Cross of Merit (Poland)
Recipients of the Silver Medal for Merit to Culture – Gloria Artis